Grevillea speciosa, commonly known as red spider flower, is a species of flowering plant in the family Proteaceae and is endemic to the Central Coast  of New South Wales. It is an erect shrub with elliptic to egg-shaped or more or less circular leaves and more or less spherical, downturned clusters of red flowers.

Description
The lower surface of the leaves is silky to softly-hairy.

Taxonomy
This species was first formally described in 1809 by Joseph Knight who gave it the name Lysanthe speciosa in On the cultivation of the plants belonging to the natural order of Proteeae. In 1975, Donald McGillivray moved it to the genus Grevillea as Grevillea speciosa in the journal Telopea. The specific epithet (speciosa) means "showy".

Distribution and habitat
Red spider flower grows on ridgetops and hillsides in moist heath, low woodland and forest in sandy soil from Gosford, Kulnura and Bucketty to just south of Port Jackson on the central coast of New South Wales.

References

External links

speciosa
Flora of New South Wales
Proteales of Australia
Plants described in 1809